The B Team with Peter Berner (also known simply as The B Team) is a twice-weekly Australian current affairs television program which aired on Sky News Live. The program is hosted by comedian Peter Berner.

Berner describes the program as a "unique and lively take on the lighter side of the news and events making headlines."

The show premiered on 16 July 2016 and airs on Saturday nights at 9pm (AEST), in the timeslot Paul Murray Live airs on weeknights. The program replaced Saturday Live, which aired during the 2016 election campaign. The program added a second weekly edition on Friday nights from 16 September 2016, replacing a compilation episode of Paul Murray Live.

The program was cancelled in September 2017.

References

External links
Sky News Official site
First Sky News Promo for The B Team via YouTube

Sky News Australia
Australian non-fiction television series
English-language television shows
2016 Australian television series debuts
2017 Australian television series endings